Fomina Ramen is a rural locality (a village) in Styopantsevskoye Rural Settlement, Vyaznikovsky District, Vladimir Oblast, Russia. The population was 19 as of 2010.

Geography 
Fomina Ramen is located 52 km southwest of Vyazniki (the district's administrative centre) by road. Usady is the nearest rural locality.

References 

Rural localities in Vyaznikovsky District